Bucking Bull is an Australian chain of roast and grill restaurants. It was founded in 1999 in Western Australia by franchise group Aktiv Brands. Later it expanded to Queensland, New South Wales, and Victoria. In 2015 there were 35 Bucking Bull outlets.
Bucking Bull places great emphasis on growing all of the products it sells in Australia. He has also mastered Beef, Pork and Lamb meat products.

See also
 List of restaurant chains in Australia

References

External links

Fast-food chains of Australia